The Group IV tournament was held in the Week commencing March 31, in Ciudad Cariari, Costa Rica, on outdoor hard courts.

Round robin

Results of Individual Ties

Panama and the US Virgin Islands promoted to Group III for 2004.

References

2003 Davis Cup Americas Zone
Davis Cup Americas Zone